list of tallest buildings and structures in Greece. This list ranks completed and topped out buildings in Greece that stand at least 213 feet (65 m) tall, based on standard height measurement. This includes spires and architectural details. An equal sign (=) following a rank indicates the same height between two or more buildings. The "Year" column indicates the year in which a building was completed.

Other structures 

A mutual incomplete list of all man-made structures in Greece taller than 100 metres.

Proposed

References

External links 
  Diagrams - SkysraperPage.com
 http://www.ead.eurocontrol.int/eadbasic/pamslight-D9DCD3103B0363F4701CA390C891AC62/CVMQCRAWTGB4K/EN/AIP/ENR/LG_ENR_5_4_en_2015-08-20.pdf 

Tallest
Greece
Greece